National Debate Federation Bangladesh (NDF BD) is one of the largest debate associations in Bangladesh. NDF BD organize National Debate festivals, Medical Debate Festivals, Debate Competition, Debate Workshops, Career and Debate School, Quiz competition  and leadership skills development workshops. The main objective of NDF BD is taking debate to the districts and beyond to create social awareness among students on various social, political and economic issues to enhance and facilitate the development of value-based human resources.

References

Student debating societies
Student organisations in Bangladesh